It's a Feedelity Affair is a compilation of some of  Norwegian producer's Lindstrøm's previously released Feedelity 12" recordings, along with a new single "The Contemporary Fix".

Track listing
"Fast & Delirious" – 6:10
"Limitations" – 4:55
"Music (In My Mind)" – 4:50
"Cane It for the Original Whities" – 5:23
"There's a Drink in My Bedroom and I Need a Hot Lady" – 10:44
"Further into the Future" – 5:12
"I Feel Space" – 7:01
"Arp She Said" – 4:57
"Gentle as a Giant" – 4:56
"Another Station" – 8:53
"The Contemporary Fix" – 6:38

References 

2006 compilation albums
Hans-Peter Lindstrøm albums
Smalltown Supersound albums